Heniochus monoceros, the masked bannerfish, is a marine ray-finned fish, a butterflyfish belonging to the family Chaetodontidae. It is found in the Indo-Pacific area.

Description
The masked bannerfish is a small-sized fish that can reach a maximum length of 23 cm.
Its body is compressed laterally, the first rays of its dorsal fin stretch in a white filament outlined with yellow.
The background body color is white with two black vertical bands. The first band masks its face starting at its mouth, and runs to the base of the first rays of the dorsal fin including at the same time its snout and eyes. The lips are white and a fin whitish band runs between the eyes and another one occurs on top of the eyes.
the masked bannerfish has a small growth on the axis of the forehead from which radiates a bright whitish to yellowish area.
The second band is right in the middle of the fish side.
A yellow area extends from the posterior edge of the second black band to the middle of the anal fin including on the way the dorsal and caudal fins. Within this yellow area close to the caudal peduncle, a brown-yellow blotch, variable in size from one fish to another, emerges.

Distribution & habitat
The masked bannerfish is widespread throughout the tropical and subtropical waters of the Indo-Pacific area from the eastern coast of Africa to Polynesia and from south Japan to New-Caledonia).

Biology
Depending on the geographic area, the masked bannerfish lives in pairs or in groups (i.e. especially along island reefs in the Indian Ocean) but always close by its shelter reef and feeds on benthic invertebrates.

Conservation status
In some geographic area the masked bannerfish is harvested occasionally for the aquarium trade. However, there do not appear to be any current threats to this species and it is listed as Least Concern (LC) by the IUCN.

References

 Biolib
 Heniochus at Wetwebmedia.com
 Fish Base
 Aquatab
 Australian Museum

External links
 

monoceros
Fish described in 1831
Taxa named by Georges Cuvier